The following highways are numbered 251:

Canada
 Manitoba Provincial Road 251
 Prince Edward Island Route 251
 Quebec Route 251

Costa Rica
 National Route 251

Japan
 Japan National Route 251

Korea, South
 Honam Expressway Branch

United States
 Alabama State Route 251
 California State Route 251
 Florida State Road 251 (former)
 Georgia State Route 251
 Illinois Route 251
 K-251 (Kansas highway)
  Kentucky Route 251
 Minnesota State Highway 251
 Montana Secondary Highway 251
 New York State Route 251
 Ohio State Route 251
 Oklahoma State Highway 251A
 Oregon Route 251
 Pennsylvania Route 251
 South Dakota Highway 251
 Tennessee State Route 251
 Texas State Highway 251
 Farm to Market Road 251 (Texas)
 Utah State Route 251 (former)
 Virginia State Route 251
 Washington State Route 251 (former)
 West Virginia Route 251
 Wyoming Highway 251
Territories:
 Puerto Rico Highway 251